Antelope Peak is a summit in the U.S. state of Nevada. The peak is in the Humboldt-Toiyabe National Forest.

Antelope Peak was so named on account of antelope (Pronghorn) which roamed the area.

References

Mountains of Eureka County, Nevada